National parks in Guatemala include:

National parks

See also
 Biosphere reserves of Guatemala

References

Guatemala

National parks
National parks